Ole Paustian (born 8 June 1937) is a Danish rower. He competed in the men's coxed four event at the 1964 Summer Olympics.

References

1937 births
Living people
Danish male rowers
Olympic rowers of Denmark
Rowers at the 1964 Summer Olympics
Sportspeople from Frederiksberg